Delphine Oggeri (born 1973) from Granier near Beaufort, Savoie, is a French ski mountaineer.

Selected results 
 1999:
 1st, La Belle étoile race (together with Valérie Ducognon)
 1st, La Tournette race (together with Valérie Ducognon)
 2nd, European Championship team race (together with Valérie Ducognon)
 2nd, La Bellevarde race, Val-d'Isère
 3rd, European Cup race "Miage Contamines Somfy" (together with Valérie Ducognon)
 2000:
 1st, French Championship team race (together with Valérie Ducognon)
 1st, La Tournette race (together with Valérie Ducognon)
 1st, Miage Contamines Somfy race (together with Valérie Ducognon)
 1st, L'Ubayenne race (together with Valérie Ducognon)
 1st, European Cup race "Vacheressane" (together with Valérie Ducognon)
 1st, European Cup race in Bivio (together with Valérie Ducognon)
 2nd, European Cup race in Bormio (together with Valérie Ducognon)
 2nd, European Cup total team ranking (together with Valérie Ducognon)
 2nd, French national ranking
 2001:
 1st, French Championship team race (together with Valérie Ducognon)
 1st, French national ranking
 2nd, European Championship team race (together with Valérie Ducognon)
 2nd, European Cup total team ranking (together with Valérie Ducognon)
 2002:
 1st, World Championship team race (together with Valérie Ducognon)
 1st, Trophée des Gastlosen (together with Delpine Oggeri)
 2nd, World Championship combination ranking
 4th, World Championship single race
 2003:
 2nd, European Championship team race (together with Nathalie Bourillon and Véronique Lathuraz)
 4th, European Championship combination ranking
 6th, European Championship single race
 2004:
 2nd, World Championship relay race (together with Delpine Oggeri)
 4th, World Championship team race (together with Valérie Ducognon)
 5th, World Championship single race
 5th, World Championship combination ranking
 2005:
 1st, Pyramide d’Oz (together with Valérie Ducognon)

Pierra Menta 

 1999: 5th, together with Valérie Ducognon
 2000: 2nd, together with Valérie Ducognon
 2001: 2nd, together with Valérie Ducognon
 2002: 1st, together with Valérie Ducognon
 2003: 1st, together with Valérie Ducognon
 2004: 3rd, together with Muriel Vaudey
 2005: 2nd, together with Valérie Ducognon
 2008: 5th, together with Valérie Ducognon

References 

1973 births
Living people
French female ski mountaineers
World ski mountaineering champions
Sportspeople from Savoie
21st-century French women